Margarethe Schreinemakers (born 27 July 1958) is a German television presenter, talk show host and journalist.

Life 
Schreinemakers was born in Krefeld and studied sociology at the University of Bonn. She works as television presenter and journalist in Germany. She presented on German broadcaster WDR Aktuelle Stunde and Extratour. From 1988 to 1991 she was talk show host for NDR Talk Show. From 1992 to 1997 she presented "Schreinemakers live" on German broadcasters Sat.1 and RTL. Several other talk shows followed during the next years. Schreinemakers has two children.  From 1986 to 1988 she lived together with German television presenter Jürgen von der Lippe. In 2011, she lives together with Jean Marie Maus. In March 2009 Schreinemakers had a heart attack.

Awards 
 Bambi for Schreinemakers live
 Goldene Kamera for Schreinemakers live

External links 
 Official website by Margarethe Schreinemakers

References 

German television presenters
German television talk show hosts
German women television presenters
German women television journalists
German television journalists
People from Krefeld
1958 births
Living people
RTL Group people
Sat.1 people
Westdeutscher Rundfunk people
Norddeutscher Rundfunk people
Radio Bremen people